Bala Deh (also Romanized as Bālā Deh) is a village in Bala Deh Rural District, Beyram District, Larestan County, Fars Province, Iran. At the 2006 census, its population was 1,751, in 340 families.

References 

Populated places in Larestan County